William Belshaw (20 February 1914 – 6 December 1975) was an English professional rugby league footballer who played in the 1930s and 1940s.

Playing career

Club career
At club level, Belshaw played for Liverpool Stanley until 1937, when he was signed by Warrington for a record fee of £1,450, (based on increases in average earnings, this would be approximately £233,900 in 2015). He went on to make 132 appearances for Warrington. He also appeared for Wigan as a World War II guest player.

International honours
Billy Belshaw, won caps for England while at Liverpool Stanley in 1935 against Wales, in 1936 against Wales, in 1937 against France, while at Warrington in 1938 against France, and Wales, in 1939 against France, and Wales, in 1940 against Wales, in 1941 against Wales, in 1943 against Wales, in 1945 against Wales, and won caps for Great Britain while at Liverpool Stanley in 1936 against Australia (3 matches), and New Zealand (2 matches), in 1937 against Australia, while at Warrington, and in 1937 against Australia (2 matches).

County honours
Billy Belshaw played , and scored 2-goals in Lancashire's 7-5 victory over Australia in the 1937–38 Kangaroo tour of Great Britain and France match at Wilderspool Stadium, Warrington on Wednesday 29 September 1937, in front of a crowd of 16,250.

Championship final appearances
Billy Belshaw played right-, i.e. number 3, and scored a goal in Wigan's 13-9 victory over Dewsbury in the Championship Final first-leg during the 1943–44 season at Central Park, Wigan on Saturday 13 May 1944, and played right- in the 12-5 victory over Dewsbury in the Championship Final second-leg during the 1943–44 season at Crown Flatt, Dewsbury on Saturday 20 May 1944.

Other notable matches
Billy Belshaw played  and was captain for a Rugby League XIII against Northern Command XIII at Thrum Hall, Halifax on Saturday 21 March 1942.

References

External links
Statistics at wigan.rlfans.com
 

1914 births
1975 deaths
England national rugby league team captains
England national rugby league team players
English rugby league players
Great Britain national rugby league team players
Liverpool City (rugby league) players
Rugby league centres
Rugby league fullbacks
Rugby league players from Wigan
Warrington Wolves players
Wigan Warriors wartime guest players